Cusson is an unincorporated community in Leiding Township, Saint Louis County, Minnesota, United States; located in the Arrowhead Region of Minnesota.

Geography
The community is immediately north of Orr on U.S. Highway 53 and 21 miles north of Cook. Cusson is within the Kabetogama State Forest.

History
A post office called Cusson was established in 1909, and remained in operation until 1929. Cusson was a station on the Duluth, Winnipeg and Pacific Railway.

References

 Rand McNally Road Atlas – 2007 edition – Minnesota entry
 Official State of Minnesota Highway Map – 2011/2012 edition

Unincorporated communities in Minnesota
Unincorporated communities in St. Louis County, Minnesota